Henry Charles Brougham, 3rd Baron Brougham and Vaux  (2 September 1836 – 24 May 1927), was a British aristocrat and civil servant.

Brougham was the son of William Brougham, 2nd Baron Brougham and Vaux, and Emily Frances Taylor, daughter of Sir Charles Taylor, 1st Baronet. Lord Chancellor Henry Brougham, 1st Baron Brougham and Vaux, was his uncle. He was educated at Eton and Trinity College, Cambridge.

He spent time in India and had an Indian wife, presumably common-law, who bore him a daughter Agnes Brougham, 1875–1930. (Agnes married Charles Creagh, an Anglo Indian Army officer, father James Creagh, and uncle O'Moore Creagh VC, later the head of the Indian Army.)

In 1857 Brougham was appointed a Clerk to the House of Lords, a position he held until 1886, when he succeeded his father in the barony and was himself able to take a seat in the upper chamber of parliament. However, he never spoke in the House of Lords. In 1905 he was made a KCVO.

Lord Brougham and Vaux married Adora Frances Olga, daughter of Peter Wells, of Windsor Forest and Great Park, and widow of Sir Richard Musgrave, 11th Baronet, in 1882. They had one son and one daughter. She died in December 1925. Lord Brougham and Vaux survived her by less than two years and died in May 1927, aged 90, only 20 days after the death of his only son, Henry. He was succeeded in the barony by his grandson, Victor.

Arms

References

1836 births
1927 deaths
3
Knights Commander of the Royal Victorian Order
People educated at Eton College
Alumni of Trinity College, Cambridge
Eldest sons of British hereditary barons